The 1951 Baltimore mayoral election saw reelection of Thomas D'Alesandro Jr.

General election
The general election was held May 8.

References

Baltimore mayoral
Mayoral elections in Baltimore
Baltimore